Ulven detention camp (German: Polizeihäftlingslager Ulven,  ("Ulven" means "the wolf")) was a concentration camp in Norway that was located in what was Os Municipality in Hordaland county (now part of Bjørnafjorden Municipality in Vestland county).

Originally a military training camp built by the Norwegian Army in 1876, it was converted into a prison camp in June 1940 during the German occupation of Norway, and it was the first Nazi prison camp in the country.

Initially, prisoners were Jews and communists, but a broader array of members from prosecuted groups began arriving at the camp. Conditions were relatively benign until 1942, when  Otmar Holenia, nicknamed "the Storm", took command and imposed harsher conditions. Ulven was used for purposes of executing individuals for various reasons. It is not known how many were murdered in the camp.

In the course of the summer of 1943, the prisoners at Ulven were used as slave labor to build the Espeland concentration camp in Bergen, to which the prisoners were transferred.

The camp is now a training ground for the Bergenhus home guard.

See also
 Nazi concentration camps in Norway
Espeland detention camp
Falstad concentration camp
Grini detention camp
Sydspissen detention camp
Tromsdalen detention camp

References

 
Nazi concentration camps in Norway
Bjørnafjorden